Leader sequence may refer to:
 Leader sequence (mRNA), a sequence of mRNA
 Leading strand, in DNA replication